Football Queensland is recognised by both the State and Federal Governments and Football Australia as the governing body for association football in Queensland.  

Football Queensland Whitsunday Coast is the regional office of Football Queensland servicing the areas between Mackay, Moranbah, Charters Towers and Bowen.

Role

FQ Whitsunday Coast was established in 2021 as part of the Future of Football 2020+ Reforms.

As part of the reform journey, the local football community was invited to engage in a six-month state-wide consultation process based on improving four key areas of the game: Governance, Administration, Competitions and Affordability.

Following the consultation, FQ Whitsunday Coast was created to better reflect the geography and strategic direction of the region. The FQ Whitsunday Coast regional office has local committee members which are elected by clubs to meet quarterly to discuss functional and geographical matters.

Clubs and competitions

The Premier competitions in the region are the FQPL Whitsunday Coast Men’s and FQPL Whitsunday Women’s, both of which form part of the Northern Conference in the Football Queensland pyramid.

References

External links 
 FQ Whitsunday Coast Official Website
 

Football Queensland
Soccer leagues in Queensland
Sports leagues established in 2021
2021 establishments in Australia
North Queensland
Central Queensland